Lars Danielsson (born 5 September 1958) is a Swedish jazz bassist, composer, and record producer.

Biography

Danielsson was born in Smålandsstenar, and was educated at the music conservatory in Gothenburg. He plays double bass, electric bass and cello. In 1985, he formed a quartet with saxophonist Dave Liebman, pianist Bobo Stenson and drummer Jon Christensen that sometimes used Danielsson's name, producing several albums. He also worked with big bands.

He played and recorded with John Scofield, Jack DeJohnette, Mike Stern, Billy Hart, Charles Lloyd, Terri Lyne Carrington, Leszek Możdżer, Joey Calderazzo, Gino Vannelli and Dave Kikoski. Since 1980, he has released solo albums with the Lars Danielssons Quartet. In these albums, Alex Acuña, John Abercrombie, Bill Evans, Kenny Wheeler, Rick Margitza and Niels Lan Doky were featured.

As a producer, Danielsson has been responsible for productions with Cæcilie Norby and the Danish radio orchestra.

Discography

Also appears on
Beginner's Guide to Scandinavia (Nascente 2011)

References

External links

 
 Lars Danielsson at All About Jazz
[ Lars Danielsson] at Allmusic

1958 births
Living people
Swedish jazz double-bassists
ACT Music artists
21st-century double-bassists